Colbertism (French: Colbertisme) is an economic and political doctrine of the 17th century, created by Jean-Baptiste Colbert, the Controller-General of Finances under Louis XIV of France. Colbertism is a variant of mercantilism that is sometimes seen as its synonym. It is more a collection of economical practices than a true current of economic thought.

Principal characteristics
Colbert's central principle was that the wealth and the economy of France should serve the state. Drawing on the ideas of mercantilism, he believed state intervention was needed to secure the largest part of limited resources. To accumulate gold, a country always had to sell more goods abroad than it bought. Colbert sought to build a French economy that sold abroad and bought domestically.

History
In the 17th century, European powers had already successfully colonized some part of the world. England had a successful hold on North America and various other areas, including India, Spain had a large hold of South America and North America, and the Dutch had successful outposts in Indonesia. The French were beginning to colonize parts of North America, but did not have permanent settlements like the Spanish and British colonies.

In 1628, Quebec became controlled by the Company of One Hundred Associates, a merchant-run joint-stock enterprise founded by Cardinal Richelieu. The Company received a monopoly over fur trade, and title to all the lands in New France, in trade for 4,000 settlers to the new colony, as well as supplies and priests. Like all other colonies, French influence in the New World led to problems with the natives: war for control of the fur trade and novel diseases killed off large portions of First Nations tribes.

France not only had colonies in North America, but also controlled the French West Indies, in the Caribbean Sea. During the 17th century, France colonized several of the West Indian Islands because of competition with the Spanish, English, and Dutch. Despite controlling very many of the West Indian Islands, only Martinique, Guadeloupe, and some nearby small islands survived as the French West Indies.

Quite surprisingly, the idea of mercantilism was first described by the French finance minister, Jean-Baptiste Colbert. Colbert's idea was a "favorable balance of trade" in which goods were exported for gold, versus an "unfavorable balance of trade" in which gold would flow out of the country. Colbert also intended to get rid of internal tariffs, and to tax the nobility, but failed.

Colbert's economic efforts and Colbertism

The simplified objectives of mercantilism in terms of Colbertism were to improve the structure of taxes in the fiscal administration, or in the burden of taxes can enhance the nation’s wealth, and of all the devices for increasing royal revenues in the king’s fiscal arsenal the best is to improve trade and industry.

Changes to taxes
Colbert immediately struck back at the financiers and tax farmers who had made enormous profits from loans and advances to the state treasury, by holding tribunals to make them give back some of their gains. 
Colbert focused his efforts next on reforming the system of taxation. At the time, the King derived the major part of his revenue from a tax called the taille, levied in some districts on individuals and in other districts on land and businesses. The taille was not a rate on income or production but what the French call an impôt de reparation, which means its global sum was fixed in advance of the fiscal year by the royal council, which directed its officials to compensate for lower revenues in one district by higher revenues in another. However, in some districts the taille was apportioned and collected by royal officials, essentially meaning it was voted by the representatives of the district.

The Crown in the 16th century realized that revenues from its indirect taxes would rise and fall in response to prosperity and depression, but such fluctuations were resisted as much as possible by the system of farming these indirect taxes, which kept the bid prices as high and as stable as possible.

At the same time, some clergy and nobles were exempt from the taxes altogether.

Colbert sought to make the tax less oppressive by levying the taille on all who should be taxed, and started a review of titles of nobility to discover and expose those falsely claiming exemption. These reforms in combination with the close supervision of the officials concerned brought large sums into the treasury.

Changes to the tariff system
He also changed the tariff system, as revised in 1664 as part of a system of protection. However, during the Renaissance in internal traits foraines were applied not only to additional commodities but also to additional provinces. Renaissance kings strongly resisted the efforts of tax farmers to unify the administration of these taxes which gave justification that when associations of tax farmers were allowed to bid on grosses fermes, they conspired to keep the bid prices down. When examining the import tariffs it can be seen that they were few and far between and that they appear to be devices to force merchants to buy import licenses rather than part of projects to build up the French industry.

Industry reforms
He spent a lot of energy trying to reorganize industry and commerce. He believed that in order to increase French power it would be essential to grow France’s share of international trade and reduce the commercial hegemony of the Dutch.

He stressed the production of high-quality goods that could compete with foreign products abroad but also the building up of a merchant fleet to carry them.

He tried to encourage foreign workers to bring their trade skills to France. To guarantee the standard of workmanship, he made regulations for every sort of manufacture and imposed fines and pillory for counterfeiting and shortcomings

He encouraged the formation of companies dedicated to building ships and attempted to obtain monopolies for French commerce abroad through the formation of trading companies. 
His system of control was resented by traders and contractors, who wanted to preserve their freedom of action and to be responsible to themselves alone. Thrifty people preferred land, annuities and money lending instead of investing in industry.

In May 1665, the king established monopoly privileges for a group of French lace manufacturers. The point of this was to prohibit anyone other than the privileged licensees from making lace.

Protective tariffs were levied on imported lace, so it could only be made in France. And then in 1667 they prohibited all foreign lace.

They next enforced quality standards on production and trade, which meant that the French economy was frozen at the level of the early or mid-17th century. This act prevented or slowed down innovation in new products, new technologies, and new methods of handling production and exchange.

He granted monopolies, subsidized luxury and the privilege of cartels, and built up a system of central bureaucracy. He created a formidable system of inspection, marks and measurements to be able to identify all those who were straying from the detailed list of state regulations.

He created a system of spies to make sure nobody was differing from the system, with punishments rating from heavy fines, public mockery or the inability to keep working in the industry.

As a result of the strictly enforced mercantilism and French absolutism, France was put out of the running as a leading nation in industrial or economic growth.

Decree of 1670
In 1670, Colbert made one of his most important single policy statements, in his famous memoire on finances. They can be expressed as follows: the object of economic statesmanship is to provide the monarch with the funds he needs for order and glory. Colonies can be planted and nurtured, home manufacturing improved in quality, internal transportation strengthened, the shipping industry expanded and the idle forced to work. Budgetary control must be put on a sound basis and the dominant revenues must be built up as much as possible. At the heart of this policy was the effort to increase royal revenues indirectly, through economic improvements. The universal rule according to Colbert is to control the economy and the fiscal system so that a sufficient quantity of cash will circulate in every corner of the country, giving all French the opportunity to make profits and pay taxes. His idea on how to lighten taxes was to "increase the cash available for general commerce [that is, all transactions] by attracting cash from other countries, keeping it inside the kingdom, and hindering its export, thus giving men the means to profit from it".

High-tech Colbertist model

Since World War II, high-tech Colbertism has been the historic form used for the intervention of a sovereign nation state, armed with a monopoly of the general interest, in the "industries of the future". There are five different qualities that can summarize this model and call into question assumed ideas about interventionism in France.

High-Tech Colbertism ended its course at the beginning of the 1980s when the need of adaptation and external constraints collided. This policy was considered a success by the French Development Party, as France experienced a tremendous growth in the post war years and transformed itself into an industrial powerhouse. 
However, there were some shortcomings in these policies as major failures in the computer and machine tool industry occurred.

Qualities of high-tech Colbertism

The first quality is offensive protectionism. A sovereign state will create a means of accumulation of scientific and financial resources. It will provide future national champions with grants, secures markets through procurement policies and will prevent foreign entry. The reasons for doing so are always, defense, technological autonomy and national sovereignty. However, success in the international marketplace is the ultimate goal.

These innovations are not only scientific or technical in nature. Nuclear power, space industry and speed trains amongst others prove that innovation is important in bringing together different actors from different fields and making them accountable for the success of a venture. National technologies were abandoned in order to guarantee the collective aim and success of the plan as a whole.

In addition, a grand project is only possible within a flexible state. The hybrid of administration-enterprise embodies two ideas: regalian authority and the logic of an enterprise. 
This "Grand Project" can only emerge when the objectives of industry participants converge with those of the overall policy. Leaving aside the convenient abstraction of the state, the "Grand Project" takes off only when a homogeneous elite is capable of mobilizing a workforce committed to the purposes of the state-entrepreneur and of national independence.

"The 'Grand Project' follows a semence of logics: the 'arsenal' Levic, the logic of public procurement and the logic of the market, which when completed, enriches the national productive systém with new, powerful actors who are sometimes rivals."

Its success depends on a transfer of results and close cooperation with industry. This can only be fruitful when the State promotes aggressive protectionism, finances the early stages of industrial development, transfers the results of public research, allows the depreciation of investment over a long period, provides certain markets through public procurement and encourages development by putting the State’s powers at the service of the national champion.

The five pillars, which the success of the grand plan can be obtained are: technical innovation, emergence of new patterns of consumption, dynamic protectionism, the risk of a new industrial participant and socio-political engineering.

One of the last identifiable grand plans was that of, which dates back its catchup plan to 1974. Since then, the plans for Minitel satellites, and cable television have appeared, but haven’t given birth to a powerful industry.

References

Economic history of France
Eponymous economic ideologies
Eponymous political ideologies
Mercantilism
17th century in France
17th century in politics
17th-century economic history